Progeny: Seven Shows from Seventy-Two is a 14-CD live album box set from the English progressive rock band Yes, released on 25 May 2015 on Rhino Records. The album consists of seven complete shows recorded in 1972 during the band's Close to the Edge tour. A 2-CD/3-LP set of highlight performances from the seven shows was released as Progeny: Highlights from Seventy-Two. Every show includes the same setlist.

Production 
Yes completed their Close to the Edge tour from July 1972 to April 1973 to support their fifth studio album, Close to the Edge (1972). The tour visited North America three times, the UK twice, and Japan and Australia for the first time. A selection of shows from 1972 from the Close to the Edge and the previous Fragile tours were recorded which formed much of the material on their first live album, Yessongs (1973).

Work on Progeny: Seven Shows from Seventy-Two began following the discovery of several multi-track reel-to-reel audio tapes containing seven full shows from the Close to the Edge tour, some being the source recordings of parts of Yessongs. They were found during the search for bonus material to include on the remastered reissues of the band's back catalogue. The original recordings were flawed in parts due to various recording mishaps, but were remixed using modern technology to attempt to compensate, particularly for the lack of bass guitar. The mastering engineers also took care to avoid the loudness war practices common to modern recordings. A lengthy essay detailing the remixing practices used during the preparation of the set is included in the packaging, and while the audio quality has received praise from some, others note the low level of Chris Squire's bass guitar, despite the attempts to boost it.

The seven shows were recorded during the second North American leg of the Close to the Edge tour. They are:

Sleeve design 
The album features new art work designed and illustrated by Roger Dean.

Critical reception 

In a positive review for AllMusic, Thom Jurek rated Progeny: Seven Shows from Seventy-Two four-and-a-half stars out of five. John Garratt of PopMatters rated Progeny 7-out-of-10 and said that "the casual Yes fan cannot go into either package expecting something that sounds like Yessongs" and that Progeny has a great supply of "the raw element".

Track listing

Note that four discs are inaccurately labelled: 
Discs nine & ten are mislabelled as "15 November 1972 – Knoxville, Tennessee" while actually it is the 14 November 1972 Athens, Georgia show.
Discs eleven & twelve are mislabelled as "14 November 1972 – Athens, Georgia" while actually it is the 15 November 1972 Knoxville, Tennessee show.
Replacements are available from Rhino Records.

Seven Shows from Seventy-Two

31 October 1972 – Toronto, Ontario

1 November 1972 – Ottawa, Ontario

11 November 1972 – Durham, North Carolina

12 November 1972 – Greensboro, North Carolina

14 November 1972 – Athens, Georgia

15 November 1972 – Knoxville, Tennessee

20 November 1972 – Uniondale, New York

Highlights from Seventy-Two

Personnel 
Yes
Jon Anderson – vocals, percussion
Steve Howe – guitar, vocals
Chris Squire – bass, vocals
Rick Wakeman – keyboards
Alan White – drums

Production
Brian Kehew – production, 2014 mixing
Steve Woolard – production
Carmine Rubino – original 1972 recording
Geoff Haslam – original 1972 recording
Mike Dunn – original 1972 recording
Dean Phelps – mastering
Paul Silvera – management
Kate Dear – packaging management
Josh Phillips – product manager
Todd Lampe – project assistance
Ralph Bennett – project assistance
Mike Johnson – project assistance
Pat Smear – project assistance
Larry Fast – project assistance
Gene Stopp – project assistance
Steve Frothingham – project assistance

Charts

References

External links 
Official Yes website at YesWorld

Yes (band) live albums
Albums with cover art by Roger Dean (artist)
2015 live albums